Edinburgh Central is a burgh constituency of the Scottish Parliament (Holyrood) covering part of the council area of Edinburgh. It elects one Member of the Scottish Parliament (MSP) by the plurality (first past the post) method of election. It is also one of nine constituencies in the Lothian electoral region, which elects seven additional members, in addition to the nine constituency MSPs, to produce a form of proportional representation for the region as a whole.

The constituency was created with the name and boundaries of a constituency of the Edinburgh Central UK Parliament  constituency. Since 1999, the constituency MSP has been an ex officio member of the board of trustees of the National Library of Scotland. From 1925 until 1999, that role had been taken by the Member of Parliament (MP) for the Westminster constituency.

The constituency was one of the few areas to vote "Yes" in the 2011 UK Alternative Vote referendum held on the same day as the 2011 Scottish Parliament election.

The seat has been held by Angus Robertson of the Scottish National Party since the 2021 Scottish Parliament election.

Electoral region

The other eight constituencies of the Lothian region are Almond Valley, Edinburgh Eastern, Edinburgh Northern and Leith, Edinburgh Pentlands, Edinburgh Southern, Edinburgh Western, Linlithgow and Midlothian North and Musselburgh.

The region includes all of the City of Edinburgh council area, parts of the East Lothian council area, parts of the Midlothian council area and all of the West Lothian council area.

Constituency boundaries and council area 

Edinburgh is represented in the Scottish Parliament by six constituencies: Edinburgh Central, Edinburgh Eastern, Edinburgh Northern and Leith, Edinburgh Pentlands, Edinburgh Southern and Edinburgh Western.

The Edinburgh Central constituency was created at the same time as the Scottish Parliament, in 1999, with the name and boundaries of an existing Westminster constituency. In 2005, however, Scottish Westminster (House of Commons) constituencies were mostly replaced with new constituencies.

As part of the First Periodic Review of Scottish Parliament Boundaries the boundaries of the constituency were changed before the 2011 Scottish Parliament election. Each electoral ward used in the creation of the redrawn Central is split, shared with neighbouring constituencies.

Inverleith (shared with Edinburgh Northern and Leith and Edinburgh Western)
Corstorphine/Murrayfield (shared with Edinburgh Western)
Sighthill/Gorgie (shared with Edinburgh Pentlands and Edinburgh Southern)
Fountainbridge/Craiglockhart (shared with Edinburgh Southern)
Morningside (shared with Edinburgh Southern)
City Centre (shared with Edinburgh Eastern)
Southside/Newington (shared with Southern)

Constituency profile and voting patterns

Constituency profile
The Edinburgh Central constituency is situated in the central-north of the City of Edinburgh. The constituency is a major tourist, financial and retail centre, covering Edinburgh's Old and New Towns, Princes Street, Haymarket, Edinburgh Castle, Holyrood Castle and the Scottish Parliament building itself.

The north and west of the constituency is very affluent, covering Victorian suburbs such as Craigleith, Murrayfield, Stockbridge and Orchard Brae, in addition to Edinburgh's well-off West End. There is some deprivation towards the south and east of the constituency around Dalry, Dumbiedykes and in patches of Edinburgh's Old Town, although overall the constituency is very affluent.

Voting patterns
In the 2007 City of Edinburgh local council election, the Liberal Democrats emerged as the largest party in wards covered by the Edinburgh Central constituency. In the 2012 local election, the Conservatives and Scottish National Party formed the two largest parties in the area. The Conservatives were ahead in 6 of the 8 electoral wards covering the Edinburgh Central constituency in the 2017 City of Edinburgh local council election.

Traditionally this constituency has been represented by the Labour Party, with the Liberal Democrats forming the main opposition. From the formation of the Scottish Parliament in 1999 until the 2011 Scottish Parliament election, the constituency of Edinburgh Central was represented by Labour's Sarah Boyack. With a re-arrangement of the constituency boundaries in 2011, which would have been won by the Liberal Democrats in 2007, the constituency narrowly returned the SNP's Marco Biagi, who gained the constituency with a slender majority of 237 votes. In 2016 the Leader of the Scottish Conservative Party, Ruth Davidson, gained the constituency from the SNP with a majority of 610 votes.

In the UK Parliament, the Edinburgh Central constituency was represented by the Labour Party almost continuously from the 1945 UK general election until the constituency was abolished in 2005, voting Conservative once in 1983.

Member of the Scottish Parliament

Election results

2020s

2010s

2000s

1990s

See also
Politics of Edinburgh

Footnotes

External links

Constituencies of the Scottish Parliament
Constituencies in Edinburgh
1999 establishments in Scotland
Constituencies established in 1999
Scottish Parliament constituencies and regions 1999–2011
Scottish Parliament constituencies and regions from 2011
Gorgie
Old Town, Edinburgh
New Town, Edinburgh